Megastigmus transvaalensis  is a species of minute wasp that feeds on Schinus terebinthifolius seeds.

References 
 

Chalcidoidea
Insects described in 1956